Jörg Friedrich (born 7 July 1959) is a German rower who competed for East Germany in the 1980 Summer Olympics.

He was born in Rathenow. In 1980, he won the gold medal as crew member of the East German boat in the men's eight competition.

External links
 
 

1959 births
Living people
People from Rathenow
People from Bezirk Potsdam
East German male rowers
Sportspeople from Brandenburg
Olympic rowers of East Germany
Rowers at the 1980 Summer Olympics
Olympic gold medalists for East Germany
Olympic medalists in rowing
Medalists at the 1980 Summer Olympics
World Rowing Championships medalists for East Germany
Recipients of the Patriotic Order of Merit in silver